NGC 4868 is a spiral galaxy located 213 million light-years away in the constellation Canes Venatici. It was discovered by William Herschel on March 17, 1787. A 2002 study suggests that a quasar may exist within NGC 4868.

See also
 List of galaxies
 New General Catalogue

References 

4868
Canes Venatici
Unbarred spiral galaxies